Galáteia ("Little Soldier") is a village in the Famagusta District of Cyprus, located on the Karpass peninsula. It is under the de facto control of Northern Cyprus, where it is a municipality belonging to the district of Iskele.

A traditional Turkish village sitting high on a hillside overlooking the valley below, Galáteia is most famous for its summer grape festival, for which people travel from all over Cyprus and the world to attend.

Renowned for the grapes harvested from its vineyards, they are one of the most exported products to other areas of Cyprus. It is also well known for producing wine, a Cypriot pomace brandy called Zivania, and a traditional grape sweet called Sucuk.

History
Galáteia was a Turkish-Cypriot enclave pre-1974 with no Greek-Cypriot inhabitants, unlike the vast majority of the surrounding villages in the Karpas peninsula. It is also believed to have been a hotbed of Turkish-Cypriot militancy (through membership of paramilitary groups like Volkan and TMT) during the turbulent times of the struggle for independence (1955–1959) and post-independence (1963–74) period.

Grape festival
Initially intended to simply provide villagers with shopping opportunities, Galáteia's grape festival evolved to become a celebration of all things related to grapes. The festival originally included more cultural activities as well, but over the years this element has gradually declined. In 2007, efforts began to reintroduce cultural elements as a separate festival to be held just before the grape festival.

Festival activities include cooking with grapes, making grape sweets, and winemaking, as well as various symposiums.

Galáteia's grape festival helps to both bring the economic and cultural importance of the grapes and vineyards of her district to the fore and to promote local viticulture.

Culture, sports, and tourism
The Turkish Cypriot Mehmetçik Sports Club was founded in Galáteia in 1943, and is now in the Cyprus Turkish Football Association (CTFA) K-PET 2nd League.

International relations

Twin towns – Sister cities
Galáteia is twinned with:
 Osmangazi, Bursa Turkey
 Bağcılar, İstanbul Turkey

See also
Harvest festival

References

Communities in Famagusta District
Populated places in İskele District
Municipalities of Northern Cyprus
Cittaslow